{{Infobox person
| name                = Karen Koster
| image               = 
| birth_date          = 
| birth_place         = The Hague, Netherlands
| death_date          = 
| death_place         = 
| nationality         = 
| alma_mater          = Trinity College Dublin
| occupation          = 
| spouse              = John McGuire (m. 2013)
| children            = 3
| employer            = Virgin Media Television (Ireland) 
| credits             = Xposé,
Ireland AM
| agent               =
| website             =
}}
Karen Koster (born 9 April 1981) is an Irish-Dutch television presenter, known for her work on Xposé and Ireland AM.

Education
She graduated from Trinity College Dublin, in 2003 with a degree in English Literature and French.

Career
In 2001, she was runner up in Raidió Teilifís Éireann's The Selection Box. She  joined TV3 as a weather presenter on Ireland AM in 2004. She presented Xposé from 2007 until its cancellation in 2019. She rejoined Ireland AM'' in 2019 as maternity cover for Ciara Doherty before becoming a permanent co-host following the cancellation of Xposé and departure of original presenter Mark Cagney.

Personal life
In 2013 she married her businessman boyfriend of six years John McGuire jr. in Sicily, Italy. In June 2014 she announced that she was pregnant and a baby boy Finn was born in December 2014.
In October 2015 she revealed that she was five months pregnant and her second son, John James, was born in February 2016. In June 2018, Koster gave birth to a daughter, Eve.

References

External links
 
 Xposé on Virgin Media Television

1981 births
20th-century Irish people
21st-century Irish people
Living people
Alumni of Trinity College Dublin
Irish infotainers
Irish television journalists
Participants in Irish reality television series
Irish people of Dutch descent
People from County Mayo
Xposé hosts